Kinkar Daw (born 4 September 1940) was an Indian cricketer. He was a right-handed batsman and a right-arm medium-pace bowler who played for Bengal. He was born in Calcutta.

Daw made a single first-class appearance, during the 1958-59 Ranji Trophy competition, against Orissa. Daw scored 4 runs in the only innings in which he batted.

Daw's uncle, Probodh Dutt, played for Bengal between 1936 and 1944.

External links
Kinkar Daw at Cricket Archive

1940 births
Living people
Indian cricketers
Bengal cricketers